Dilip Gurumurthy (born 18 September 1956) is an Indian basketball player. He competed in the men's tournament at the 1980 Summer Olympics.

References

External links
 

1956 births
Living people
Basketball players from Karnataka
Indian men's basketball players
Olympic basketball players of India
Basketball players at the 1980 Summer Olympics